Desmia geminipuncta is a moth in the family Crambidae. It was described by George Hampson in 1912. It is found in Colombia.

References

Moths described in 1912
Desmia
Moths of South America